Thomas Alexander Parrott (November 27, 1914 – June 14, 2007) was an American Central Intelligence Agency (CIA) officer.

Personal
He was born at Fort Sam Houston in Texas, the son of Lt. Col. Roger Sheffield Parrott (1883 in Ohio – ?) and Mary B. Parrott (1884 in North Dakota – ?). He graduated from high school in Princeton, New Jersey, and then graduated from Princeton University in 1936. He died of a heart attack at his home in Washington, D.C.

Military career
He served in the United States Army during World War II in North Africa and Italy, earning the
Soldier's Medal and Legion of Merit, retiring as a colonel from the U.S. Army Reserve.

CIA career
He served as Deputy Chief of the Soviet Division of the Clandestine Services Unit of the CIA, then as a base chief in Germany and then as assistant to Director Allen Dulles. In 1962 he was assigned to the White House during the Cuban Missile Crisis. He retired from the CIA in 1973.

Family
He and wife Barbara had three children, son Tommy Parrott died in 1957 and daughters Cynthia and Susan.

References

The Washington Post obituary

1914 births
2007 deaths
Military personnel from San Antonio
People from Princeton, New Jersey
Princeton University alumni
United States Army officers
United States Army personnel of World War II
People of the Central Intelligence Agency
Recipients of the Legion of Merit
Burials at Arlington National Cemetery
Recipients of the Soldier's Medal
Military personnel from New Jersey